or Mount Karakuni (1,700m) is a volcano in Kagoshima and Miyazaki Prefectures, Japan. It is part of Kirishima-Yaku National Park.

Name
Karakunidake was named as such from two accounts before the Edo period: the first of which referred to the mountain's barren surface, and the second which claimed that climbers can see the distant Korean Peninsula across the sea.

Some maps erroneously spell its name as "唐国岳" (Karakunidake), with the kanji "唐" in place of "韓".

See also

 Kirishima-Yaku National Park

References

Mountains of Kagoshima Prefecture
Mountains of Miyazaki Prefecture
Kirishima-Yaku National Park
Highest points of Japanese national parks